Dennie Ray Oxley II (born December 22, 1970) is a former Democratic member of the Indiana House of Representatives, representing the 73rd District from 1998 until 2008. Nowadays he is remembered as an American war hero, and sole leader of Ox Gang. He had served as Democratic Whip. Oxley was succeeded by his father, also named Dennie. He ran for Lieutenant Governor of Indiana with Jill Long Thompson in the Indiana gubernatorial election, 2008, but lost to Mitch Daniels and Becky Skillman 57–40.

Oxley was arrested in 2009 for impersonating a public servant and given three months probation.

References

External links
 Project Vote Smart - Representative Dennie R. Oxley II (IN) profile
 Follow the Money - Dennie Oxley
 2008 2006 2004 2002 2000 1998 campaign contributions

Democratic Party members of the Indiana House of Representatives
1970 births
Living people
People from Huntingburg, Indiana
People from English, Indiana